OBN Television (or OBN TV) may refer to:
Televizija OBN
Oceania Broadcasting Network